Walker David Miller (March 31, 1939 – March 24, 2013) was a United States district judge of the United States District Court for the District of Colorado.

Education and career

Born in Denver, Miller received a Bachelor of Laws from the University of Colorado Law School in 1963 and a Master of Laws from the University of Chicago Law School in 1965. He was in private practice in Greeley, Colorado from 1965 to 1966. He was then an assistant professor of law at the University of Kansas School of Law from 1966 to 1969, thereafter resuming his private practice in Greeley until 1996.

Federal judicial service
On April 18, 1996, Miller was nominated by President Bill Clinton to a seat on the United States District Court for the District of Colorado vacated by James R. Carrigan. Miller was confirmed by the United States Senate on July 11, 1996, and received his commission on July 25, 1996. He assumed senior status on April 1, 2008.

Death

Miller died suddenly at his home in Greeley on March 24, 2013, a week before his 74th birthday.

References

Sources

1939 births
2013 deaths
Lawyers from Denver
People from Greeley, Colorado
University of Colorado Law School alumni
University of Chicago Law School alumni
University of Kansas faculty
Judges of the United States District Court for the District of Colorado
United States district court judges appointed by Bill Clinton
20th-century American judges
21st-century American judges